Be My Guest is a 1965 British musical film. It was filmed at Pinewood Studios, England. The film is notable for the appearances of Steve Marriott and Jerry Lee Lewis. It was released as a B movie to support the Morecambe and Wise feature film The Intelligence Men.

The film was a follow-up to the commercially successful Live It Up!.

Noted American rock music producer Shel Talmy coordinated the film's musical score.

Talmy also composed the title music which was performed by The Niteshades, who also appeared in the closing scene. The recording, released on CBS Records, reached no. 32 on pirate radio station Radio London's chart in the summer of 1965.

Cast
 David Hemmings as Dave 
 Steve Marriott as Ricky
 John Pike as Phil
 Andrea Monet as Erica
 Ivor Salter as Herbert 
 Diana King as Margaret 
 Avril Angers as Mrs. Pucil
 Joyce Blair as Wanda
 David Healy as Hilton Bass (as David Healey)
 Tony Wager as Artie
 David Lander as Routledge
 Robin Stewart as Matthews
 Monica Evans as Dyllis
 Pamela Ann Davy as Zena (as Pamela Ann Davies)
 Douglas Ives as Steward
 Jerry Lee Lewis as Self
 The Nashville Teens as Themselves
 The Zephyrs as Slash Wildly and the Cuts Throats
 Kenny & The Wranglers as Rocky Steel and the Sparks (as Kenny And The Wranglers)
 The Niteshades as Themselves
 The Plebs as Themselves

Music performers

rest of cast listed alphabetically 
Ken Bernard Himself - singer (as Kenny and the Wranglers)
John Carpenter Himself - drummer of The Zephyrs (as Slash Wildly and the Cut-Throats)
Terry Crowe	 singer (as The Plebs)
Mick Dunford  guitarist (as The Plebs)
John Hawken  pianist (as The Nashville Teens)
John Hinde   bassist of The Zephyrs (as Slash Wildly and the Cut-Throats)
Mike Lease   organist of The Zephyrs (as Slash Wildly and the Cut-Throats)
Jerry Lee Lewis with The Nashville Teens
Danny McCulloch Himself - bassist (as The Plebs)
The Nashville Teens  
John Peeby  guitarist of The Zephyrs (as Slash Wildly and the Cut-Throats)
Ray Phillips  vocalist (with The Nashville Teens)
Pete Shannon  bassist (with The Nashville Teens)
Arthur Sharp  singer (with The Nashville Teens)
Howard Roberts organist (with The Niteshades)
Martin Davies bassist (with The Niteshades)
Tony Lopez singer (with The Niteshades)
Ricky King guitarist (with The Niteshades)
Ed Sones singer (with The Niteshades)
Keith Harvey drummer (with The Niteshades)

References

External links
 
 

1965 films
British musical films
Films directed by Lance Comfort
1960s English-language films
1965 musical films
1960s British films